Steven Scott Sinclair (born August 2, 1971 in Victoria, British Columbia) is a former pitcher for the Toronto Blue Jays and Seattle Mariners.

Sinclair made his major league debut for the Blue Jays on April 25, 1998, against the Chicago White Sox and pitched in 24 games that season. On July 28, 1999, he was traded to the Mariners with Tom Davey in exchange for David Segui. Sinclair currently holds the records for saves by a left handed reliever (15) while playing in the Venezuelan Winter League for the Cardenales de Lara.

External links
, or Retrosheet, or Pelota Binaria (Venezuelan Winter League)

1971 births
Living people
Baseball people from British Columbia
Canadian expatriate baseball players in the United States
Cardenales de Lara players
Caribes de Oriente players
Charlotte Knights players
Dunedin Blue Jays players
Gulf Coast Blue Jays players
Hagerstown Suns players
Iowa Cubs players
Major League Baseball players from Canada
Medicine Hat Blue Jays players
Navegantes del Magallanes players
Canadian expatriate baseball players in Venezuela
Seattle Mariners players
Sportspeople from Victoria, British Columbia
Syracuse Chiefs players
Tacoma Rainiers players
Tigres de Aragua players
Toronto Blue Jays players
Victoria Capitals players